Wilhelm Fitzenhagen's String Quartet in D minor, Op. 23, is the composer's only work for the medium. It was published in 1879 by Breitkopf & Härtel.

Structure

The work is structured in four movements:

 Adagio - Allegro moderato
 Andante
 Allegro
 Finale: Larghetto - Allegro energico

To date the quartet, which won a prize offered by the St Petersberg Chamber Musical Union, has not been recorded commercially.

References
Notes

Sources

External links

Fitzenhagen
Compositions in D minor